The 110 metres hurdles, or 110-metre hurdles, is a hurdling track and field event for men. It is included in the athletics programme at the Summer Olympic Games. The female counterpart is the 100 metres hurdles. They are positioned so that they will fall over if bumped into by the runner. Fallen hurdles do not carry a fixed time penalty for the runners, but they have a significant pull-over weight which slows down the run. Like the 100 metres sprint, the 110 metres hurdles begins in the starting blocks.

For the 110 m hurdles, the first hurdle is placed after a run-up of 13.72 metres (45 ft) from the starting line. The next nine hurdles are set at a distance of 9.14 metres (30 ft) from each other, and the home stretch from the last hurdle to the finish line is 14.02 metres (46 ft) long.

The Olympic Games have included the 110 metre hurdles in their program since 1896. The equivalent hurdles race for women was run over a course of 80 metres from 1932 to 1968. Starting with the 1972 Summer Olympics, the women's race was set at 100 metres. In the early 20th century, the race was often contested as 120 yard hurdles, thus the imperial units distances between hurdles.

The fastest 110 metre hurdlers run the distance in around 13 seconds. Aries Merritt of the United States holds the current world record of 12.80 seconds, set at the Memorial Van Damme meet on 7 September 2012 in Belgium.

History
For the first hurdles races in England around 1830, wooden barriers were placed along a stretch of 100 yards (91.44 m).

After the length of the course was rounded up to 110 metres in France in 1888, the standardisation was essentially complete, except that in Germany, 1 metre high hurdles were used until 1907.

The massively constructed hurdles of the early days were first replaced in 1895 with somewhat lighter T-shaped hurdles that runners were able to knock over.

However, until 1935, runners were disqualified if they knocked down more than three hurdles, and records were only recognized if the runner had left all hurdles standing.

In 1935, the T-shaped hurdles were replaced by L-shaped ones that easily fall forward if bumped into and therefore reduce the risk of injury.  However, these hurdles are weighted, so it is disadvantageous to hit them.

The current running style where the first hurdle is taken on the run with the upper body lowered instead of being jumped over and with three steps each between the hurdles was first used by the 1900 Olympic champion, Alvin Kraenzlein. The 110 metre hurdles have been an Olympic discipline since 1896.

Women's history
Women ran the event occasionally in the 1920s, but it never became generally accepted.

From 1926 to 1968, women competed in the 80 metre hurdles, which was increased to 100 metres starting in 1961 on a trial basis, and was officially implemented in competition in 1969.

Currently, women run the 110 metre distance at the World Athletics Relays shuttle hurdle relay, which features two men and two women participating together.  The event debuted at the 2019 event.

Other events
In 1900 and 1904, the Olympics also included a 200-metre hurdles event, and the IAAF recognized world records for the 200 metre hurdles until 1960. Don Styron held the world record in the event for over 50 years, until Andy Turner broke the record in a specially arranged race at the Manchester City Games in 2010: Styron still holds the world record in the 220 yard low hurdles as of 2021.

Technique
The sprint hurdles are a very rhythmic race because both men and women take 3 steps (meaning 4 foot strikes) between each hurdle, no matter whether running 110/100 metres outdoors, or the shorter distances indoors (55 or 60 metres). In addition, the distance from the starting line to the first hurdle - while shorter for women - is constant for both sexes whether indoors or outdoors, so sprint hurdlers do not need to change their stride pattern between indoor and outdoor seasons. One difference between indoor and outdoors is the shorter finishing distance from the last (5th) hurdle indoors, compared to longer distance from the last (10th) hurdle outdoors to the finish line.

Top male hurdlers traditionally took 8 strides from the starting blocks to the first hurdle (indoors and outdoors). The 8-step start persisted from (at least) the 1950s to the end of the 20th century and included such World- and Olympic champions as Harrison Dillard, Rod Milburn, Greg Foster, Renaldo Nehemiah, Roger Kingdom, Allen Johnson, Mark Crear, Mark McCoy, and Colin Jackson. However, beginning in the 2000s, some hurdle coaches embraced a transition to a faster 7-step start, teaching the men to lengthen their first few strides out of the starting blocks. Cuban hurdler Dayron Robles set his 2008 world record of 12.87 using a 7-step start. Chinese star Liu Xiang won the 2004 Olympics and broke the world record in 2006 utilizing an 8-step approach, but he switched to 7-steps by the 2011 outdoor season. After the 2010 outdoor season, American Jason Richardson trained to switch to a 7-step start and went on to win the 2011 World Championship. American Aries Merritt trained in Fall 2011 to switch from 8 to 7, and then had his greatest outdoor season in 2012 - running 8 races in under 13 seconds - capped by winning the London 2012 Olympics and then setting a world record of 12.80.

Of the 10 men with the fastest 110m hurdle times in 2012, seven used 7-steps, including the top 4: Aries Merritt, Liu Xiang, Jason Richardson, and David Oliver. Hurdle technique experts believe the off-season training required to produce the power and speed necessary to reach the first hurdle in 7 steps, yields greater endurance over the last half of the race. That added endurance allows hurdlers to maintain their top speed to the finish, resulting in a faster time.

Junior level competition 

In American high school track and field and at many international Under-20 athletics competitions, the 110 metres hurdles are mostly the same as their professional counterparts. The main difference between the high school hurdles and college-level/ professional hurdles is the height. This change in height drastically changes the requirements placed on the hurdler to clear the barrier with the same amount of speed. High school hurdling technique is the same as professional except on the higher hurdles everything is exaggerated. As a high schooler makes the transition from the 39’s to the 42’s there are many things they must adjust to, the most prevailing issue is getting down after clearing the hurdle. 39-inch hurdlers are used to the normal sprinting motion right after they get off the hurdle but for a newly transitioned 42-inch hurdler that extra half a second can feel very foreign. The second major difference in technique between 39’s and 42’s is the take-off distance. When a high school hurdler approaches his first hurdle they are putting as much power into each step as possible and attempting to gain all the speed they can so by their eighth step they’ll be about six inches away from the hurdle. When attempting to clear a 42-inch hurdle the athlete can no longer run headfirst into the hurdle with disregard for the height of the hurdle. The newly made college hurdler needs to learn how to shorten their strides so they can take off the ground from farther away to clear a 42-inch barrier. 

Both before and after this change of technique world class hurdler, Aries Merritt was an elite level hurdler, at the peak of his high school career Aries Merritt achieved a still standing Wheeler High school record of 13.91 seconds. Almost all top level American hurdlers started their careers in high school including Roger Kingdom at Vienna high school and many more.

The world record in the 110m hurdles at the 39-inch height is 12.72 by Sasha Zhoya, achieved at the 2021 World Athletics U20 Championships – Men's 110 metres hurdles in Nairobi, Kenya on 21 August 2021.

Milestones

First official IAAF world record: 15.0 seconds, Forrest Smithson (USA), 1908
First under 15 seconds: 14.8 seconds, Earl Thomson (CAN), 1920
First under 14 seconds: 13.7 seconds, Forrest Towns (USA), 1936
First under 13.5 seconds: 13.4 seconds, Jack Davis (USA), 1956
First under 13 seconds: 12.93 seconds, Renaldo Nehemiah (USA), 1981
First under 12.9 seconds: 12.88 seconds, Liu Xiang (CHN), 2006

All-time top 25 

Correct as of August 2022.

Assisted marks 
Any performance with a following wind of more than 2.0 metres per second does not count for record purposes. Below is a list of all wind-assisted times equal or superior to 12.94:
Roger Kingdom (USA) ran 12.87 sec (+2.6) in Barcelona on 10 September 1989.
Liu Xiang (CHN) ran 12.87 sec (+2.4) in Eugene, Oregon on 2 June 2012.
David Oliver (USA) ran 12.89 sec (+3.2) in Eugene, Oregon on 6 July 2008.
Renaldo Nehemiah (USA) ran 12.91 sec (+3.5) in Champaign, Illinois on 1 June 1979.
Colin Jackson (GBR) ran 12.94 sec (+2.8)  in Sestriere on 31 July 1994.

Most successful athletes
Athletes with two or more victories at the Olympic Games & World Championships:

5 wins:
Allen Johnson has won the most 110 m hurdles titles at Olympic and World level, one Olympic (1996) & four World (1995, 1997, 2001, 2003)
3 wins:
Greg Foster, three World Championship titles, 1983, 1987 & 1991 (also  won Olympic silver in 1984)
2 wins:
Lee Calhoun (USA), two Olympic victories, 1956, 1960
Roger Kingdom (USA), two Olympic victories, 1984 and 1988
Colin Jackson (GBR), two World Championship victories, 1993 and 1999 (also won Olympic Silver in 1988)
Liu Xiang (CHN), Olympic, 2004, World, 2007
Omar McLeod (JAM), Olympic, 2016, World, 2017

Olympic Games medalists

World Championships medalists

Season's bests

Notes and references

External links

IAAF list of 110-metres-hurdles records in XML

Events in track and field
Hurdling
Summer Olympic disciplines in athletics
Men's athletics
Sprint hurdles